Lower Paeania or Paiania Hypenerthen was a deme of ancient Attica; it was located on the eastern side of Hymettus. One of two demoi named Paeania.

The site of Lower Paeania is located on the eastern outskirts of modern Liopesi.

References

Populated places in ancient Attica
Former populated places in Greece
Demoi